Jason Stoltenberg defeated Wally Masur 6–1, 6–3 in the final, in Manchester, England, to secure the title.

Seeds

  MaliVai Washington (first round)
  Henrik Holm (semifinals)
  Cédric Pioline (quarterfinals)
  Wally Masur (final)
  Marc Rosset (first round)
  Andrei Chesnokov (second round)
  Richard Fromberg (second round)
  Guillaume Raoux (quarterfinals)

Draw

Finals

Section 1

Section 2

External links
 1993 Manchester Open Singles draw

Singles